Jean Watson is an American nurse theorist and nursing professor who is best known for her theory of human caring. She is the author of numerous texts, including Nursing: The Philosophy and Science of Caring. Watson's research on caring has been incorporated into education and patient care at hundreds of nursing schools and healthcare facilities across the world.

Biography 
Watson was born July 21, 1940, in Williamson, West Virginia, the youngest of eight children. She attended high school in West Virginia. Watson knew she wanted to be a nurse at the age of 10 when she saw a friend of her older sister having a seizure. Her father died suddenly when she was 16 years old, something she claims made her particularly sensitive to people and their suffering for the rest of her life. She attended the Lewis Gale School of Nursing located in Roanoke, Virginia, where she graduated in 1961. Keen to go beyond the medical pathology she learned at nursing school, Watson completed both her Bachelors and Masters degrees in Psychiatric Nursing at the University of Colorado at Boulder by 1966. In 1973, after earning her Ph.D. in Educational Psychology and Counseling, Watson begun her career teaching nursing courses at the CU College of Nursing. By 1979 she was the director of the university’s doctoral program, and in 1986 she became the founder and director of its Center for Human Care. She served as dean of the College of Nursing at the University Health Sciences Center and president of the National League for Nursing.

In 1997, Watson sustained an injury that resulted in the loss of her left eye, then a year later, her husband of 37 years passed away. She claims the two incidents allowed her to understand her work on another level, saying: “It was this journey of losing my eye and losing my world as I had known it, including my beloved and devoted husband, who shortly thereafter, committed suicide –that I awakened and grasped my own writing".

In 2008 she founded the Watson Caring Science Institute, an NGO that aims to advance Watson’s work on Caring Theory.

Caring theory
The theory of human caring, first developed by Watson in 1979, is patient care that involves a more holistic treatment for patients. As opposed to just using science to care for and heal patients, at the center of the theory of human caring is the idea that being more attentive and conscious during patient interactions allow for more effective and continuous care with a deeper personal connection. Watson's theory was influenced by several philosophers and thinkers including Abraham Maslow, Carl Rogers, and Pierre Teilhard de Chardin, each of whom were pioneers in creating the concept of transpersonal. Watson defines the idea of transpersonal as "an inter-subjective human-human relationship in which the person of the nurse affects and is affected by the person of the other. Both are fully present in the moment and feel a union with the other." The four major concepts in the science of caring are health, nursing, environment or society, and human being.

 Health: The connection between the mind, body, and spirit. This concept is dependent upon the likeness of how one is seen versus what they experience.
 Society: The value that society projects upon people about how they should act or achieve in life.
 Nursing: The science of human care and health. This involves interactions with individuals that have an active role in patient care and those that are being taken care of.
 Human being: A person that is valued, respected, and cared for. They are seen as fully functional and whole.
Over the course of her many academic works, Watson developed a set of 10 "caritive" processes to act as a guide for the core of nursing. The following are translation of the "carative" factors into clinical processes.

 Practice of loving kindness and equanimity within context of caring consciousness.
 Being authentically present, and enabling and sustaining the deep belief system and subjective life world of self and the one-being-cared-for.
 Cultivation of one’s own spiritual practices and transpersonal self, going beyond ego self, opening to others with sensitivity and compassion.
 Developing and sustaining a helping-trusting, authentic caring relationship.
 Being present to, and supportive of, the expression of positive and negative feelings as a connection with deeper spirit of self and the one-being-cared-for.
 Creative use of self and all ways of knowing as part of the caring process; to engage in artistry of caring-healing practices.
 Engaging in genuine teaching-learning experience that attends to unity of being and meaning, attempting to stay within others’ frames of reference.
 Creating healing environment at all levels (physical as well as non-physical), subtle environment of energy and consciousness, whereby wholeness, beauty, comfort, dignity, and peace are potentiated.
 Assisting with basic needs, with an intentional caring consciousness, administering “human care essentials,” which potentiate alignment of mindbodyspirit, wholeness, and unity of being in all aspects of care; tending to both the embodied spirit and evolving spiritual emergence.
 Opening and attending to spiritual-mysterious and existential dimensions of one’s own lifedeath; soul care for self and the one-being-cared-for.

Academic appointments
At the University of Colorado Watson served as the dean emerita of nursing. She also held the title of Distinguished Professor of Nursing; the highest honor accorded its faculty for scholarly work. In 1999 she assumed the Murchinson-Scoville Chair in Caring Science, the nation’s first endowed chair in Caring Science, based at the University of Colorado Denver & Anschutz Medical Center.

Dr. Watson has earned undergraduate and graduate degrees in nursing and psychiatric mental health nursing and holds her PhD in educational psychology and counselling.

Leadership achievements
Watson founded the original Center for Human Caring in Colorado in 1988. She is a past president of the National League for Nursing. She is founder of the original Center for Human Caring in Colorado and is a Fellow of the American Academy of Nursing. She is Founder and Director of non-profit foundation, Watson Caring Science Institute.

Honors and awards
Watson has been awarded sixteen honorary doctoral degrees, including thirteen international honorary doctoral degrees. She has received numerous awards including:

 Fetzer Institute Norman Cousins Award
 Fulbright Research Award
 Living Legend, inducted in 2013 by the American Academy of Nursing
 An international Kellogg Fellowship in Australia
 Pioneering Work in Caring Science award
 The honorary chairperson of the Japanese International Society of Caring and Peace
 The Visionary Award for Caring Science Leadership
She holds sixteen Honorary Doctoral Degrees, including 13 International Honorary Doctorates (E. G. Sweden, United Kingdom, Spain, British Colombia and Quebec, Canada, Japan, Turkey, Peru and Colombia, S. America, Ireland).

Works
Watson is the author and co-author of over 30 books on caring theory. Her first book, Nursing: The Philosophy and Science of Caring, was published in 1979, Boston, Little Brown. It set out the frame work of Watson’s theory of caring and caritas factors. The book has been continually revised as Watson theories developed, so as to remain a comprehensive overview of the history and evolution of Caring Science philosophy and theory.

Her 2002 book Assessing and measuring caring in nursing and health sciences, and 2005 book Caring science as sacred science, have both received the American Journal of Nursing’s “Book of the Year” award.

Watson’s more recent work looks at unitary caring science, examining the role of nurses through the lens of world view of unison, belonging and connection.

References

Living people
1940s births
Nurses from West Virginia
American women nurses
Nursing school deans
Nursing educators
Nursing researchers
Psychiatric nurses
Nursing theorists
University of Colorado Boulder alumni
University of Colorado faculty
American university and college faculty deans
American women academics
Women deans (academic)
21st-century American women
People from Williamson, West Virginia